Chennai Lions is an Indian professional table tennis franchise based in Chennai, that plays in Ultimate Table Tennis. It was established in 2019 by film director Aishwarya R. Dhanush and entrepreneur Sameer Bharat Ram. They are the reigning champions of the league after defeating Dabang Delhi TTC in 2019 UTT finals.

Players

Current squad

Honours

Domestic 

 Ultimate Table Tennis

 Winners (1): 2019

References

External links 

 Team profile

Sport in Chennai
2019 establishments in Tamil Nadu
Ultimate Table Tennis
Sports teams in Tamil Nadu
Table tennis clubs